Tengku Hasbullah bin Raja Hassan (born 11 March 1983) is a Malaysian footballer who currently is a free agent. He has played for Kelantan FA, T-Team and Kedah FA in his career.

His older brother Tengku Hazman is also a former professional football player.

References

External links
 

Living people
Malaysian footballers
Kelantan FA players
Kedah Darul Aman F.C. players
People from Kelantan
Malaysian people of Malay descent
1983 births
Association football midfielders